Nina Kiriki Hoffman (born March 20, 1955, in San Gabriel, California) is an American fantasy, science fiction and horror writer.

Profile

Hoffman started publishing short stories in 1975. Her first nationally published short story appeared in Asimov's Science Fiction magazine in 1983. She has since published over 200 in various anthologies and magazines.

Her short story "A Step Into Darkness" (1985) was one of the winners of the L. Ron Hubbard Writers of the Future award and was published in the first of the Writers of the Future anthologies.

Her second collection of short stories, Courting Disasters and Other Strange Affinities, was nominated for the 1992 Locus Award for best collection of the year.

Her novella '"Unmasking", published in 1992 by Axolotl Press, was a finalist for the 1993 World Fantasy Award.  Her novella "Haunted Humans" (seen in The Magazine of Fantasy & Science Fiction, July 1994) was a finalist for the 1995 Nebula Award for Best Novella and on the same ballot her novelette "The Skeleton Key" was shortlisted for the Nebula Award for Best Novelette. Her short story "Trophy Wives" won the 2008 Nebula Award for Best Short Story.

Her first novel, The Thread That Binds the Bones, won the Bram Stoker Award for first novel. Other novels include The Silent Strength of Stones (a sequel to Thread), A Fistful of Sky, and A Stir of Bones. Her best known works are set in the Pacific Northwest and Southern California, and involve people (often entire families) with magical talents.  The stories have invited comparison to Zenna Henderson and Ray Bradbury's stories on similar themes.

She has been shortlisted, awarded and finalist for awards for novella, novelette, novel, fantasy novel, adult literature, work for younger readers, young adult books, and children's literature for the Nebula, Locus, World Fantasy Award, the Theodore Sturgeon Award, the HOMer award from CompuServe, the Endeavour Award, the Mythopoeic Society Award, the James Tiptree Jr. Award and the Philip K. Dick Award.

Her short story "Trophy Wives" won a 2008 Nebula award.

Her brother is the musician Kristian Hoffman.

She lives in Eugene, Oregon. She is a member of the Wordos writers' group. In 2017, she competed in the SLUG Queen pageant in the persona of country singer "Patsy Slugtana".

As of 2020, she teaches small classes in science fiction, fantasy, and horror writing via Zoom for the Fairfield County Writers' Studio.

Bibliography

Novels 

 The Thread That Binds the Bones (winner of the Bram Stoker Award for First Novel) 1993
 The Silent Strength of Stones (Nebula Award and World Fantasy Award Finalist) 1995
 Body Switchers from Outer Space (#14 in R.L. Stine's " Ghosts of Fear Street" series) 1996
 Why I'm Not Afraid of Ghosts (#23 in R.L. Stine's "Ghosts of Fear Street" series) 1997
 I Was A Sixth Grade Zombie (#30 in R.L. Stine's "Ghosts of Fear Street" series) 1998
 Echoes (Star Trek: Voyager #15) (with Kristine Kathryn Rusch and Dean Wesley Smith) 1998
 Third Wheel (part of the Sweet Valley Jr. High series) as "Jamie Suzanne" (1999)
 A Red Heart of Memories (World Fantasy Award Finalist) (1999)
 Past the Size of Dreaming (2001)
 A Fistful of Sky (2002)
 A Stir of Bones (2003)
 Catalyst: A Novel of Alien Contact (Philip K. Dick Award nominee) (2006) Tachyon Publications
 Spirits That Walk in Shadow (2006)
 Fall of Light (2009)
 Thresholds (2010)
 Meeting (2011)

Short fiction 
Collections
 Courting Disasters and Other Strange Affinities (short story collection) (1991)
 Common Threads (collection published in limited release by Hypatia Press) (1995)
 Time Travelers, Ghosts, and Other Visitors (short story collection) (2003)
 Permeable Borders (short story collection) 2012
Short stories

 Universal Donor (short story, originally published in Pulphouse #4) 1989
 Compandroid (short story, originally published in SF Review Vol 1 #3) 1990
 Legacy of Fire (Author's Choice Monthly #14) 1990
 Unmasking (novella) (World Fantasy Award Finalist) (1992)
 "Skeleton Key" (novelette) (Nebula Award Finalist) (1993)
 "Haunted Humans" (novella) (Nebula Award Finalist) (1994)
 "Home for Christmas" (novella) (World Fantasy Award Finalist) (1995)
 Water Everywhere (short story, published in the anthology Sorceries edited by Katharine Kerr) (1996)
 Trophy Wives (Nebula Award Finalist) 2008
 Futures in the Memories Market Clarkesworld Magazine, June 2010
 "Ghost Hedgehog" (short story) Tor.com 2011
 "Firebugs" Night Shade Books, November 2012
  Multimart Perihelion Science Fiction, July 2014

Award nominations 

1985  "A Step Into Darkness" (short story)  Writers of the Future 1st quarter: 1985 Hubbard
1991  Courting Disasters and Other Strange Affinities (collection): 1992 Locus
1992  Unmasking (novella): 1993 World Fantasy
1993  "The Skeleton Key" (novelette): 1995 Nebula
1993  The Thread That Binds the Bones (first novel): 1994 Stoker  Winner 
1993  The Thread that Binds the Bones fantasy novel: 1994 Locus
1994  "Haunted Humans" (novella): 1995 Nebula
1994  "Haunted Humans" (novella): 1995 Locus
1994  "Haunted Humans" (novella): 1995 HOMer
1995  "Home for Christmas" (novelette): 1996 Nebula
1995  "Home for Christmas" (novella): 1996 World Fantasy
1995  "Home for Christmas" (short fiction): 1996 Theodore Sturgeon Memorial Award shortlist
1995  "Home for Christmas" (novelette): 1996 HOMer
1995  The Silent Strength of Stones (novel): 1996 World Fantasy
1995  The Silent Strength of Stones (fantasy novel): 1996 Locus/6
1995  The Silent Strength of Stones (novel): 1997 Nebula
1996  "Airborn" (novella): 1997 HOMer
1999  A Red Heart of Memories (novel): 2000 World Fantasy
1999  A Red Heart of Memories (fantasy novel): 2000 Locus
1999  A Red Heart of Memories finalist: 2000 Endeavour
2001  Past the Size of Dreaming (fantasy novel): 2002 Locus
2001  Past the Size of Dreaming finalist: 2002 Endeavour
2002  A Fistful of Sky (fantasy novel): 2003 Locus
2002  A Fistful of Sky (adult literature): 2003 Mythopoeic
2002  A Fistful of Sky short list: 2004 Tiptree
2003  A Stir of Bones (work for younger readers): 2004 Stoker
2003  A Stir of Bones (young adult book): 2004 Locus
2003  A Stir of Bones finalist: 2004 Endeavour
2003  Time Travelers, Ghosts, and Other Visitors finalist: 2004 Endeavour
2006  Catalyst finalist: 2007 Philip K. Dick
2006  Spirits That Walk in Shadow (young adult book): 2007 Locus
2006  Spirits That Walk in Shadow finalist: 2007 Endeavour
2006  Spirits That Walk in Shadow (children's literature): 2007 Mythopoeic

References

External links 

 Susan O'Fearna's comprehensive bibliography
 
 Brief profile at Wheatland Press website
 Interview at Strange Horizons
 Interview at Locus
 Video of "Patsy Slugtana, country singer" at SLUG Queen competition

1955 births
Living people
20th-century American novelists
20th-century American short story writers
20th-century American women writers
21st-century American novelists
21st-century American short story writers
21st-century American women writers
American fantasy writers
American horror writers
American science fiction writers
American women novelists
American women short story writers
Nebula Award winners
People from San Gabriel, California
The Magazine of Fantasy & Science Fiction people
Women horror writers
Women science fiction and fantasy writers
Writers from Eugene, Oregon
Novelists from Oregon
Novelists from California